Kyle Brown (born October 20, 1967) is an American computer scientist at IBM, Durham, North Carolina, USA, known for his work in software design pattern. He is an IBM Fellow. He has published ten books, over 100 commercial articles and papers, and holds more than 25 patents. He was the program chair for the Pattern Languages of Programs Conference in 2002 and again in 2018.

Books
Books he has written or co-written include:

References

External links 
 Brown's personal homepage

IBM Fellows
1967 births
Living people